The 1918 SMU Mustangs football team was an American football team that represented Southern Methodist University (SMU) as a member of the Southwest Conference (SWC) during the 1918 college football season. In its second season under head coach J. Burton Rix, the team compiled an overall record of 4–2 with a mark of 1–2 in conference play, placing fifth in the SWC.The mustang were outscored by a total of 45 to 39 on the season.

Schedule

References

SMU
SMU Mustangs football seasons
SMU Mustangs football